The Army Police, usually called the Lanceiros, is the military police of the Portuguese Army — formerly designated as Polícia Militar (Military Police) between 1953 and 1976. In the Portuguese Army it is a speciality of the Cavalry Arm, being the instruction and organization of the Army Police forces is of the responsibility of the Regimento de Lanceiros Nº 2 (2nd Lancers Regiment).

The military police wear a black beret.

Field organization

Operational units of the Army Police:
 Army Police Group of the Army's Permanent Operational Force General Support Forces;
 Army Police platoons of the Mechanized Brigade, of the Rapid Reaction Brigade, of the Intervention Brigade, of the Military Zone of Azores and of the Military Zone of Madeira;
 Army Police platoon of the Military Prison;
 Army Police platoon of the School of Cavalry.

Equipment

Infantry equipment 

 Glock 17 Gen 5;
 Benelli Supernova
 Heckler & Koch MP5K
 FN SCAR L STD
 FN Minimi Mk3
 FN40GL Grenade launcher

Vehicles 

 Yamaha TDM 900
 Mitsubishi L200
 Land Rover Defender 110
 Toyota Land Cruiser
 Citroën Berlingo
 Mercedes-Benz Vito
 Unimog 1750L
 DAF YA 4440 D
 Mercedes-Benz Atego 4X2

See also
 Army Police (Brazil)

References

Portuguese Army
Military of Portugal
Military provosts of Portugal